Frederick Albert Reardon (19 April 1931 – 1 May 2006) was a British boxer. He fought as Freddie Reardon and competed in the men's lightweight event at the 1952 Summer Olympics.

He won the 1952 Amateur Boxing Association British lightweight title, when boxing out of the Downham Community ABC.

References

External links
 

1931 births
2006 deaths
British male boxers
Olympic boxers of Great Britain
Boxers at the 1952 Summer Olympics
Boxers from Greater London
Lightweight boxers